Csány is a village in Heves County, Northern Hungary Region, Hungary.

Sights to visit
    Szigeti-castle
    Melon museum
    Church
    Halász castle (now home for old people)

References

Populated places in Heves County